The Theme of Bulgaria was a province of the Byzantine Empire established by Emperor Basil II after the conquest of Bulgaria in 1018. Its capital was Scupi (or Skoupoi) and it was governed by a strategos. The local inhabitants were Bulgarians. Nevertheless the Bulgarians  kept their nationality, which reached particular strength after the Second Bulgarian Empire was formed in the 12th century. The period ended with the Uprising of Asen and Peter.

The conquest of the First Bulgarian Empire by Byzantium lasted half a century. For this reason, Basil II the Bulgar Slayer after the conquest did not decide on any changes in order to bloodlessly establish the new status quo. The Bulgarian lands that offered the fiercest resistance were separated into the theme of Bulgaria. Initially the Byzantine emperor Basil II issued an order that the tax system of the subdued Bulgarian kingdom continue to be applied in the annexed Bulgarian lands. The Bulgarian patriarchate was downgraded to an archbishopric called Archbishopric of Ohrid, that retained an autocephalous status. The Bulgarian aristocracy also retained its position. Troops were recruited mainly from the Bulgarian population. However, only ten years later after the death of Basil II, the Byzantine tax system was introduced. Slavic literacy, liturgy and traditions of the Archbishopric were in some places subjected to persecution. Some of the Bulgarian aristocracy had slowly but consistently been removed from its position. Many were sent on assignments in other realms of the Empire remote from the Balkans. This situation gave rise to discontent among the local population.

Rebellions aimed at restoration of the Bulgarian state broke out. The first rebellion rose in Belgrade in 1040. It was headed by Petar Deljan, grandson of Tsar Samuel. This was followed by several more uprisings: Uprising in Thessaly (1066) led by Nikoulitzas Delphinas; Uprising of Georgi Voyteh; Uprising in Paristrion, and the revolts of Dobromir in Mesembria and Leka in Sredets (today Sofia) in 1079. After the coming to power of the Komnenian Dynasty, the Bulgarian uprisings subsided, due to the integration of the old Bulgarian aristocracy in the rule of the empire, as seen in the writings of Anna Komnene about her grandmother Maria of Bulgaria in "Alexiad".

At the end of the 11th century the Byzantine domains in the Balkans became an arena of fierce hostilities. The Normans invaded from the south and the knights of the First (1096–97) and then the Second Crusade (1146–47) advanced from west. Most frightful were the renewed raids of the Turkic barbarians from the steppes, the Uzes, Pechenegs and the Cumans. At the end of the 12th century, formally Byzantium was the sovereign, but in many Balkan areas the Byzantine power was nominal. In 1185, the Normans landed in Dyrrachium again, moved east and looted Salonika. The chaos in the imperial domains encouraged the Bulgarians to restore their state with the rebellion of the brothers Peter and Asen, and Bulgaria sought again to dominate the Balkans. The disintegration of Byzantium was complete when in 1204 the Fourth Crusade captured Constantinople. The Latins abolished the Byzantine Empire and set up their own feudal states in the southern Balkans.

Notes

Themes of the Byzantine Empire
11th century in Bulgaria
12th century in Bulgaria
11th century in Serbia
Byzantine provinces in Macedonia
History of Kosovo
History of Skopje
Medieval Macedonia
States and territories established in 1018